Coreopsis gigantea, known by the common name giant coreopsis, is a woody perennial plant native to coastal regions of central and southern California and also to northern Baja California.

Description
It is summer deciduous, leaving a sculptural bare trunk and branches during the dry season.

Bright green leaves and flowers are on the top of the trunk, while the rest of the trunk is bare.

The numerous flowers are yellow, daisy-like,  in diameter. It blooms from the spring to early summer.

The related C. maritima is found in similar areas.

Distribution and habitat 
It is found in coastal dunes, chaparral hillsides, and exposed sea bluff habitats.

It is distributed on the coasts of: Southern California and the Channel Islands; the Central Coast region; San Francisco Bay Area; and in Mexico on the northwestern Baja California Peninsula and Guadalupe Island.

Storing water in this way makes the plants tolerant of drought but especially susceptible to frost.

Cultivation
Giant Coreopsis is cultivated as an ornamental plant by specialty nurseries. It is planted in native plant, drought tolerant, and wildlife gardens, and in natural landscaping and habitat restoration projects.

The plant needs good drainage and is not tolerant of excess moisture, needing minimal watering during the summer.

References

External links

 UC— Jepson Manual treatment for Leptosyne gigantea (Coreopsis gigantea) 
 Leptosyne gigantea (Coreopsis gigantea) — Calphotos Photo gallery, University of California 
San Francisco Chronicle: "Coreopsis is supersize on the Channel Islands" — Sullivan, R. & J. Eaton; October 8, 2008.

gigantea
Flora of California
Flora of Baja California
Flora of Mexican Pacific Islands
Plants described in 1873
Garden plants of North America
Drought-tolerant plants
Flora without expected TNC conservation status